KYTZ (106.7 FM, "The Rock Farm") is a radio station broadcasting a classic rock format. Licensed to Walhalla, North Dakota, it serves Langdon, North Dakota and Morden, Manitoba. The station is currently owned by Simmons Broadcasting. All four Simmons Broadcasting stations share studios at 1403 Third Street in Langdon, ND. Canadian studios are at 467 Stephen Street in Morden, Manitoba.

History
The station was known as "Z106.7" with a Hot AC format for several years and became a Top 40 (CHR) format as "Big 106" in 2011.

On July 4, 2021 KYTZ changed their format from top 40/CHR to classic rock, branded as "106.7 The Rock Farm".

References

External links
Big 106 website

YTZ
Classic rock radio stations in the United States